Basavaraju or Basava Raju is an Indian given name or surname. Notable persons with that name include:

 Basavaraju Venkata Padmanabha Rao (1931–2010), Indian Telugu actor, comedian, director and producer from Andhra Pradesh
 Basavaraju Saraiah, Indian politician from Telangana
 L. Basavaraju (1919–2012), Indian Kannada scholar and writer

Telugu-language surnames